Wittenberg is a town in Shawano County, Wisconsin,  United States. As of the 2000 census, the town had a total population of 894. The Village of Wittenberg is located within the town. The unincorporated community of Whitcomb is also located within the town.

Geography
According to the United States Census Bureau, the town has a total area of 34.2 square miles (88.6 km2), of which, 34.1 square miles (88.3 km2) of it is land and 0.1 square miles (0.3 km2) of it (0.29%) is water.

Demographics
As of the census of 2000, there were 894 people, 298 households, and 238 families residing in the town. The population density was 26.2 people per square mile (10.1/km2). There were 331 housing units at an average density of 9.7 per square mile (3.7/km2). The racial makeup of the town was 93.62% White, 2.24% Black or African American, 3.24% Native American, 0.11% from other races, and 0.78% from two or more races. 0.67% of the population were Hispanic or Latino of any race.

There were 298 households, out of which 36.9% had children under the age of 18 living with them, 68.1% were married couples living together, 6.7% had a female householder with no husband present, and 19.8% were non-families. 16.8% of all households were made up of individuals, and 9.1% had someone living alone who was 65 years of age or older. The average household size was 2.72 and the average family size was 3.04.

In the town, the population was spread out, with 33.3% under the age of 18, 5.8% from 18 to 24, 25.8% from 25 to 44, 21.6% from 45 to 64, and 13.4% who were 65 years of age or older. The median age was 34 years. For every 100 females, there were 123.5 males. For every 100 females age 18 and over, there were 103.4 males.

The median income for a household in the town was $42,841, and the median income for a family was $44,904. Males had a median income of $29,732 versus $20,962 for females. The per capita income for the town was $15,410. About 6.0% of families and 6.7% of the population were below the poverty line, including 9.0% of those under age 18 and 11.9% of those age 65 or over.

References

Towns in Shawano County, Wisconsin
Towns in Wisconsin